Krasnosulinsky District is an administrative and municipal district (raion), one of the forty-three in Rostov Oblast, Russia. It is located in the west of the oblast. Its administrative center is the town of Krasny Sulin. Population: 81,825 (2010 Census);  The population of Krasny Sulin accounts for 49.9% of the district's total population.

References

Notes

Sources

Districts of Rostov Oblast